The ELF 500 ROC was a motorcycle that competed in the  and  500 cc Road Racing World Championship.

ELF 500 ROC 
A new European motorcycle made its debut under the Elf banner in 1996. The engine was a Swissauto 500 cc two-stroke V4 engine, designed as a compact and powerful unit which could be used in both sidecar racing outfits and solo bikes. It utilised a single balance shaft and a 6-speed cassette-type gearbox. Its crankshaft design allowed for the engine to fire at different angles, allowing the rider to choose either "big-bang" or "screamer" engine characteristics. The engine was housed in a frame designed by Serge Rosset's small ROC firm, based at Annemasse in France. The bike competed in the 1996 and 1997 500 cc World Championships.

1996
Sponsored by soft drink giant Pepsi, the team consisted of Adrian Bosshard and Juan Borja. Over the course of the season William Costes stood in for Bosshard, Chris Walker later replaced Bosshard, and Marti Craggill stood in for Walker at the final round. At its debut race in Malaysia, Borja scored an impressive 10th place. The bike would go on to record 8 point-scoring finishes out of 15 races, its highest placing being that of 8th by Borja at Donington Park. The motorcycle proved fast but unreliable as it notched up a string of non-finishes. Borja finished the season on 34 points, Walker on 2 points.

1997
Borja remained in the team, and was joined by new teammate Jürgen Fuchs. Reliability was still a concern but there was improvement and the bikes finished 13 times in the points – 6 times inside the Top 10. Its highpoint came in Brazil, with Fuchs scoring a best finish of 6th. Borja finished the season on 37 points, Fuchs on 28.

The ELF team ceased GP competition at the end of 1997, but the bikes returned to the grid in 1998 in the form of the Muz 500.

See also 

Honda NSR500
Aprilia RSW-2 500
Cagiva C593
Suzuki RGV500
Yamaha YZR500
Paton PG500RC
Sabre V4

External links
Specs for the 1996 ELF 500
Official Swissauto site
Website of Andreas Wuthrich, 500 cc Project Manager at Swissauto

Grand Prix motorcycles